The last clear chance doctrine of tort law, is applicable to negligence cases in jurisdictions that apply rules of contributory negligence in lieu of comparative negligence. Under this doctrine, a negligent plaintiff can nonetheless recover if he is able to show that the defendant had the last opportunity to avoid the accident. Though the stated rationale has differed depending on the jurisdiction adopting the doctrine, the underlying idea is to mitigate the harshness of the contributory negligence rule. Conversely, a defendant can also use this doctrine as a defense.  If the plaintiff has the last clear chance to avoid the accident, the defendant will not be liable.

Statement
The Restatement (Second) of Torts explains the doctrine in detail as follows:

See also 
Avoidable consequences rule
Personal injury

References

Tort law
Law of negligence
Legal doctrines and principles